32nd district of Czech senate is based in Teplice. The Seat is currently vacant due to death of the incumbent Senator Jaroslav Kubera.

Senators

Election results

1996 election

2000 election

2006 election

2012 election

2018 election

2020 by-election

References

32